Lucky Pierre may refer to:
 The Adventures of Lucky Pierre, a 1961 nudie cutie-sexploitation film
 L. Pierre, a musical project by Scottish musician Aidan Moffat
 Lucky Pierre (band), an American band fronted by Kevin McMahon and including one-time member Trent Reznor
 Pierre Larouche, ice hockey forward, nicknamed Lucky Pierre
 "Lucky Pierre", a song in Act I of Leonard Sillman's Broadway musical New Faces of 1952
 Lucky Pierre (film), a 1974 French comedy film
 Pierre Salinger, journalist, press secretary to President Kennedy, and (briefly) US Senator 
 Lucky Pierre, a lawyer played by Salinger in an episode of the 1960s television program Batman (TV series) 
 The middle partner in a threesome